Odontogama is a genus of moths in the family Lasiocampidae. The genus was erected by Per Olof Christopher Aurivillius in 1915.

Species
Odontogama milleri Tams, 1926
Odontogama nigricans Aurivillius, 1915
Odontogama superba Aurivillius, 1914

References

Lasiocampidae